Climatic Change is a biweekly peer-reviewed scientific journal published by Springer Science+Business Media covering cross-disciplinary work on all aspects of climate change and variability. It was established in 1978 and the editors-in-chief are Michael Oppenheimer (Princeton University) and Gary Yohe (Wesleyan University).

Abstracting and indexing 
The journal is abstracted and indexed in:

References

External links 
 

English-language journals
Climatology journals
Springer Science+Business Media academic journals
Monthly journals
Publications established in 1978